The Lukang Culture Center or Lukang Assembly Hall is a cultural center in Lukang Township, Changhua County, Taiwan.

History
The building was established in 1928 as a public assembly hall. It was named Chung Shan Hall after the handover of Taiwan from Japan to the Republic of China in 1945. It was once used as a senior citizens center and Wanchun Gong Suhu Laoyeh Temple. After renovation, it was renamed Lukang Culture Center.

Architecture
The roof framework of the building was constructed by wood and steel trusses and the top was paved with cement tiling. On the left wall is a wooden monument about local gentlemen's donating money to build the hall.

See also
 List of tourist attractions in Taiwan

References

1928 establishments in Taiwan
Buildings and structures completed in 1928
Buildings and structures in Changhua County
Cultural centers in Taiwan
Tourist attractions in Changhua County